Jagadguru Sri Sri Sri Dr. Nirmalanandanatha Mahaswamiji, the 72nd Pontiff of Sri Adichunchanagiri Mahasamsthana Math, Mandya District, Karnataka, the Chancellor of Adichunchanagiri University (Established under Karnataka Act No. 18 of 2013) and the President of Sri Adichunchanagiri Shikshana Trust (R.) that runs more than 500 institutions. He is an ordained disciple of Jagadguru Padmabhushan recipient Sri Sri Sri Dr. Balagangadharanatha Mahaswamiji. Sri Mahaswamiji was initiated into the holy lineage of ‘Sanyasa’ in the year 1998. 

Sri Mahaswamiji is mastered in both modern scientific and technological knowledge and ancient wisdom. Under the guidance of Sri Guruji, he has established and served institutions ranging from Nursery to Graduation and Research Centers in the rural parts of Karnataka and beyond. The Trust is catering to the educational needs of more than 1,30,000 students through its 475 institutions including 50 of them in higher learning institutions.Around 5,000 students are being provided free education with boarding and lodging facilities. 

As a part of the research culture, Sri Mahaswamiji believes in inculcating it among the students and faculty members of all Institutions of Higher Learning for which special grants are allotted for initiating research work and publication of research papers. One of the institutions, Cancer Research Institute started in 1995, attached to the Medical College (AIMS) at BG Nagara, has been planned to be upgraded to an international level – Translational Research Center, focusing on cancer related issues, diabetics, cardiology and various contagious diseases. Annually, Sri Math organizes free Medical Camps, Blood Donation Camps, Cleft Lip & Cleft Palate Camps in collaboration with Rotaplast USA.   

Sri Mahaswamiji believes in living in harmony with the environment and under this category, Vanasamvardhana Programme is in place, through which five-crore saplings were planted in different parts of the State and are being maintained also. Sri Math, in addition to supply of saplings to the public, provides tree guards and tractors for watering the plants. Sri Math maintains Goshalas, purifies local pond water in villages and engages in desilting tanks, so as to improve the community ground water table. Towards relief for victims of natural calamities, Sri Math has given a lot of support in terms of supplying food articles, clothes & dress materials, besides constructing about 5,000 houses for the families of affected people in North Karnataka and Tamil Nadu during Tsunami & devastating floods.

A temple complex built by Sri Math, at a cost of about 100 crores of rupees, is the abode of Lord Kalabhyraveshwara Swamy at Sri Kshetra Adichunchanagiri was inaugurated in 2006 which is attracting lakhs of devotees from different parts of State and the country. Sri Math has established Shakha Maths’ not only in the 15 Districts of Karnataka State, but also at Varanasi & Naimisharanya (Uttar Pradesh), Chitrakoot & Ujjain (Madhya Pradesh), Rameshwaram (Tamil Nadu), New Delhi and New Jersey (USA). Arrangements have been made for regular poojas, satsangs, festivals and spiritual discourses at all these places.

Sri Mahaswamiji is a Patron for Kumbh Mela programme held annually at T. Narasipur, Mysuru District. Also, he is the Convenor of Hindu Dharma Acharya Sabha (HDAS) and Foundation for Unity of Religions and Enlightened Citizenship (FUREC). He has been constantly delivering discourses on Science, Religion and Spirituality in various Conferences both in India and abroad. He has visited many reputed Universities on invitation and delivered discourses to the Indian community at Oxford, Cambridge, Princeton, Penn State and in India, at IIT-Kharagpur, BHU-Varanasi, IISc-Bengaluru and other institutions / centers alike. 

As a part of annual celebrations, Sri Math organizes programmes like Janapada Mela, Youth Festival, Jana / Mahila Jagruthi Programmes, Priesthood Training for all communities, Mass Marriage Ceremony, Sarva Dharma Sammelana and Jnana Vijnana Tantrajnana Mela (JVTM). In JVTM, Sri Math has introduced the concept of awarding “Vijnatham Award” for renowned Scientists, Technologists and Spiritual Leaders who have made substantial contribution at National / International arena. 

By considering the yeoman services to society, University of Mysore conferred the Honorary Doctorate of D.Litt. (Honoris Causa) on April 30th 2016 at Sri Kshetra Adichunchanagiri.

References

1969 births
Living people
Indian Hindu monks
21st-century Hindu religious leaders
Religious leadership roles
Indian Hindus